The 2012–13 Scottish Premier Under 20 League (also known as the Clydesdale Bank Under-20 Premier League due to sponsorship reasons) was the fifteenth season of the Scottish Premier under-20 League, the highest youth Scottish football league, and also the first season under the new under 20 format. It began in August 2012 and ended in May 2013.

Changes
The league was converted from under-19 to under-20 and was expanded from 12 to 15 teams. Rangers left the league as a result of it entering liquidation at the end of the season to be replaced by Dundee which was promoted to the replace Rangers in the Premier League. In addition, the under-20 sides of the relegated Scottish Premier League club Dunfermline Athletic and the clubs finishing third and fourth in the Scottish Football League took up a place in the new league. A position in the league for teams outside the SPL was based on their youth academy's elite status.

The definition of an under-20 player is a player who has not attained the age of 19 years on 31 December of the year before the relevant season commences. Additionally, a limited number of overage players are allowed to compete in each fixture. The under-20 league was adopted in order to promote the development of youth footballers and to assist in their progression to the full professional game, when compared to the under-18 or under-19 format.

League table

Matches
Teams played each other twice, once at home, once away.

References

External links
2012–13 Scottish Premier Under-20 League at Scotprem

Under
SPFL Development League